SS Zeeland may refer to one of two ocean liners of the Red Star Line:

 , a  ship built for Cunard Line as Java in 1865; renamed Zeeland for Red Star Line in 1878
 , an  ship; scrapped in 1930

Ship names